Lüchengguangchang (literally "Lücheng Square" or "Green City Square") is a metro station of Zhengzhou Metro Line 1. The station lies beneath the Zhongyuan Road, to the east of the Lücheng Square.

Station layout 
The station has 2 floors underground. The B1 floor is for the station concourse and the B2 floor is for the platforms and tracks. The station has one island platform and two tracks for Line 1.

Exits

Future development
The station is planned to be a three-line interchange station among Line 1, Line 9 and Line 10. The Line 10 is currently under construction.

Surroundings
Lücheng Square
Bishagang Park (south entrance)
Zhengzhou University (old campus)
Zhengzhou Children's Palace
Zhengzhou Municipal People's Government

References

External links

Stations of Zhengzhou Metro
Line 1, Zhengzhou Metro
Railway stations in China opened in 2013